Minolia pseudobscura is a fossil species of sea snail, a marine gastropod mollusk in the family Solariellidae.

Distribution
This fossil species occurs in Japan and South Australia. The small, solid shell has a depressed-conical shape. Its height attains 11 mm and its diameter also 11 mm. The shell contains seven whorls and a wide open umbilicus. The nucleus is smooth and rounded.  The other whorls are tabulate with an almost horizontal surface and the lateral surface vertical and somewhat convex. The aperture is subcircular. The thin peristome is continuous.

References

 Makiyama, J., 1959: Matajiro Yokoyama's Tertiary fossils from various localities in Japan. Part 3. Palaeontological Society of Japan, Special Papers, no. 5, pp. 1–4, pls. 58–86
 Higo, S., Callomon, P. & Goto, Y. (1999). Catalogue and bibliography of the marine shell-bearing Mollusca of Japan. Osaka. : Elle Scientific Publications. 749 pp.

External links
 The University Museum of the University of Tokyo: Minolia pseudobscura

pseudobscura
Gastropods described in 1927